Galway African Film Festival (GAFF) is an annual African film festival taking place in Galway on the west coast of Ireland in late May / early June to coincide with Africa Day an annual commemoration on 25 May of the 1963 founding of the Organization of African Unity (OAU). It aims to showcase the wealth and diversity of African film that would otherwise be inaccessible to Galway audiences.
Secondly, the Festival aims to reflect and celebrate the culturally diverse profile of Galway society, the city with the highest percentage (2.8%) of people from African countries.
The Festival is organised by the Galway One World Centre in collaboration with the Huston School of Film & Digital Media and the Galway Film Society. Venues for screenings of films have included the Town Hall Theatre, Huston School of Film & Digital Media, and Nuns Island Theatre.
The Festival is supported by Irish Aid, Galway City Arts Office, Galway City Council and the Galway Advertiser.

Programme
The Festival offers a big variety of genres of African Cinema, including documentaries, children's films, shorts, classic and contemporaries. The films are normally not on general release within the Republic, thereby providing people in Ireland an opportunity to see the continent of Africa through a perspective that is different from Hollywood . Guests at the Festival have included Keith Shiri (Africa at the Pictures, London), Alex Ogou (Lead Actor, Clouds over Conakry), Tandeka Matatu (Producer, Jerusalema) and Andrew Webber (Editor, Mirror Boy).
Films in 2010 included The Figurine Araromire (Nigeria), Mascarades (France/Algeria) and A Sting in a Tale (Ghana), while in 2011, the festival included acclaimed movies Benda Bilili (Congo), Microphone (Egypt) and The Atlete (Ethiopia). In 2012 highlights included Viva Riva, an award-winning Congolese drama, two Egyptian films about the Arab Spring of 2011 and an Ethiopian / UK co-production, Town of Runners.

History
The Galway African Film Festival was established in 2008.

2008

 Kirikou and the Sorceress
 Niger – Magic & Ecstasy in the Sahel
 Musical Brotherhoods from the Trans-Saharan Highway
 Bamako
 Clouds over Conakry
 Azur & Asmar: The Princes' Quest
 Waiting for Happiness
 Bunny Chow
 Africa Unite

2009

 Kirikou and the Wild Beasts
 Zanzibar Soccer Queens
 Retour à Gorée
 From a Whisper
 Jerusalema

2010

 Bhovas & Sam
 The Legend of the Sky Kingdom
 Le Pèlerin de Camp Nou (Captain Majid)
 Mascarades
 The Figurine
 For the Best and for the Onion
 Arugba
 A Sting in a Tale

2011

 Pumzi
 Staff Benda Bilili
 Satin Rouge
 Welcome Nelson
 Voices from Robben Island
 Microphone
 WWW - What a Wonderful World
 Mirror Boy
 Manuscripts of Timbuktu
 The Athlete / Atletu
 White Wedding

2012

 All I Wanna Do
 Kinyarwanda
 Death for Sale
 Glitterboys and Ganglands
 Forbidden
 18 Days
 Viva Riva!
 This is my Africa
 'Town of Runners Anchor Baby2013

 Mwansa the Great Fluorescent Sin Call Me Kuchu Dirty Laundry Material
 Nollywood Doing it Right, parts 1 & 2
 Last Flight to Abuja Phone Swap alaskaLand Yellow Fever The Lion's Point of View Hasaki Ya Suda La Pirogue2014

 Jonah
 The New World
 Half of a Yellow Sun
 African Metropolis Andalousie, mon amour! Tey  Rags & Tatters Twaaga 
  Kwaku Ananse
 Mother of George Forgotten Kingdom

2015The Road We TravelMiners Shot Down SoleilsLantanda Adiós CarmenLast Song before the WarDrexciyaThings of the Aimless Wanderer2016Soko SonkoShield & SpearArlette – Courage is a Muscle100% DakarBurkina, Princess YennengaThe RooftopsKhawadjat I shot Bi KidudeWelcome to the Smiling CoastAfripedia Afronauts Timbuktu2017
The tenth festival took place 19–21 May 2017 in the Mick Lally Theatre.Shashamane (Ethiopia/Jamaica)Tchindas (Spain/Cape Verde)Sembene! (Senegal)Tell Me Sweet Something (South Africa)Atlantic (Morocco)Ayanda (South Africa)Kati Kati (Kenya)

2018
The eleventh festival took place 9–10 June 2018 in the Bank of Ireland Theatre, NUI Galway.Dem Dem! (Senegal, short)Strike A Rock (South Africa)T-Junction (Tanzania)Black Barbie (Ghana)Ali, The Goat, and Ibrahim (Egypt)Zizou (Tunisia/France)Ouaga Girls (Burkina Faso)

2019
The twelfth festival took place on 1–2 June 2019 in the Bank of Ireland Theatre, NUI Galway.Finding Fela (United States; Nigerian subject)The Fisherman (Ghana)Creation in Exile (France; African subjects)Anbessa (USA/Italy; Ethiopian subject)The Swan Song (Morocco)Vagando Maputo (France/Madagascar)Battledream Chronicles (France; Afro-Caribbean subject)Ko Nkanga'' (South Africa)

See also
 African Cinema
 List of film festivals
 List of FESPACO award winners

References

External links
 Nigeria Films, 2010
 Galway African Film Festival
 Africa Day in Ireland
 Irish Aid

Annual events in Ireland
African Film Festival
Film festivals in Ireland
May events
June events
Tourist attractions in Galway (city)
African film festivals